Wade Hampton High School may refer to:

Wade Hampton High School (Greenville, South Carolina)
Wade Hampton High School (Varnville, South Carolina)